Georges Breitman (27 March 1920 – 27 January 2014) was a French track and field athlete who competed in the 1948 Summer Olympics and in the 1952 Summer Olympics. He was born in Paris.

References

1920 births
2014 deaths
French decathletes
French male pole vaulters
Athletes from Paris
Olympic athletes of France
Athletes (track and field) at the 1948 Summer Olympics
Athletes (track and field) at the 1952 Summer Olympics